Christl Haas (19 September 1943 – 8 July 2001) was an Austrian Alpine skier. She competed at the 1964 and 1968 Winter Olympics and won a gold and a bronze medal, respectively.

Biography
Haas grew up in Hahnenkamm, Kitzbühel, known for its alpine skiing courses. At the World Cup she won four downhill competitions in total. At the Alpine skiing World Championship 1962 in Chamonix, France, she won gold in the downhill competition.

Haas became a national hero as a twenty-year-old Olympic champion in the downhill event at the first Innsbruck Winter Olympics. She became an instant superstar in her homeland as she won the gold medal in her home nation. Haas followed up her success at Innsbruck with a bronze medal at the 1968 Winter Olympics in Grenoble, France.

After retiring from competitions Haas became a ski instructor and opened a sporting goods store in Sankt Johann. As an Austrian gold medalist, Haas was selected with luger Josef Feistmantl to light the Olympic torch for the opening of the 1976 Winter Olympics on 4 February 1976. In 2001, she had a heart attack while swimming in the Mediterranean Sea at Antalya, Turkey and died as a result.

Notes and references

External links

 
 Short biography from the Austrian Olympic Committee 

1943 births
2001 deaths
Alpine skiers at the 1964 Winter Olympics
Alpine skiers at the 1968 Winter Olympics
Austrian female alpine skiers
Olympic alpine skiers of Austria
Olympic gold medalists for Austria
Olympic bronze medalists for Austria
Deaths by drowning
Accidental deaths in Turkey
Sportspeople from Tyrol (state)
Olympic medalists in alpine skiing
Medalists at the 1964 Winter Olympics
Medalists at the 1968 Winter Olympics
Olympic cauldron lighters
20th-century Austrian women
21st-century Austrian women